The 2017 Nana Trophy was a professional tennis tournament played on outdoor clay courts. It was the sixth edition of the tournament and part of the 2017 ITF Women's Circuit, offering a total of $60,000 in prize money. It took place in Tunis, Tunisia, from 24–30 April 2017.

Singles main draw entrants

Seeds 

 1 Rankings as of 17 April 2017

Other entrants 
The following players received wildcards into the singles main draw:
  Chiraz Bechri
  Zoë Kruger
  Sandra Samir
  Julia Vulpio

The following players received entry into the singles main draw by a protected ranking:
  Alexandra Dulgheru
  Petra Martić
  Xu Shilin

The following players received entry from the qualifying draw:
  Vivien Juhászová
  Katarzyna Kawa
  Marta Paigina
  Ganna Poznikhirenko

The following player received entry into the singles main draw by a lucky loser:
  Manon Arcangioli
  Ágnes Bukta

Champions

Singles

 Richèl Hogenkamp def.  Lina Gjorcheska, 7–5, 6–4

Doubles

 Guadalupe Pérez Rojas /  Daniela Seguel def.  Ágnes Bukta /  Vivien Juhászová, 6–7(3–7), 6–3, [11–9]

External links 
 2017 Nana Trophy at ITFtennis.com
 Official website

2017 in Tunisian sport
2017 ITF Women's Circuit
2017
2017